John Laing may refer to:

People
John Laing (bishop) (died 1483), a bishop of Glasgow
John Laing (bibliographer) (1809–1880), minister of the Free Church of Scotland 
Sir John Laing (businessman) (1879–1978), a British entrepreneur and 2nd president of the John Laing Group
John Laing (footballer) (1884–1944), an Australian rules footballer
John Laing (director) (1982–2006), a New Zealand film and television director
Sir John Maurice Laing (1918–2008), a senior executive of John Laing plc
John Laing (musician), a musician who recorded "Mo Ghile Mear" in 2013

Other uses
John Laing Group, a British infrastructure company

See also
John Lang (disambiguation)
John Lange (disambiguation)